Happy Now or Happy Now? may refer to:

Film and theatre
Happy Now? (play), a play by Lucinda Coxon
Happy Now? (film), a British film starring Ioan Gruffudd

Music
"Happy Now" (Bon Jovi song), 2009
"Happy Now" (Take That song), 2011
"Happy Now" (Kygo song), 2018, featuring Sandro Cavazza
"Happy Now" (Zedd and Elley Duhé song), 2018
"Happy Now?" (No Doubt song), 1997
"Happy Now", a 1987 EP by The Beloved
 ”Happy Now”, a 2017 song by Slander
Happy Now (album), by Gang of Four, released in 2019

See also
 Are You Happy Now? (disambiguation)